John Finch, 6th Earl of Winchilsea (24 February 1682/83 – 9 September 1729) was an English peer.

He was a son of Heneage Finch, 3rd Earl of Winchilsea and his fourth wife Elizabeth Ayres (who died 10 April 1745). He was christened on 6 March 1683 in Eastwell, Kent, England

After the death of his older unmarried half-brother Heneage Finch, 5th Earl of Winchilsea in 1726 John Finch succeeded him.

He died unmarried too on 9 September 1729 and was buried in Westminster Abbey.

References

1680s births
1729 deaths
06
04
17th-century English nobility
18th-century English people
John
People from Eastwell, Kent